Yahaya may refer to the following people:

Given name
Yahaya Abubakar, Nigerian traditional ruler
Yahaya Abdulkarim, governor of Sokoto State, Nigeria 
Yahaya Adamu (born 1993), Nigerian football player
Yahaya Ahmad (1947–1997), founder and chairman of the DRB-HICOM Group of Malaysia 
Yahaya Bello (born 1975), Nigerian politician and businessman 
Yahaya Maikori, Nigerian lawyer 
Yahaya Mohammed (born 1988), Ghanaian football player
Yahaya Musa (born 1986), Australian-American association football 
Yahaya Wumpini Abdul Ganiyu (born 1991), Ghanaian football midfielder

Surname
Alhaji Yahaya Madawaki (1907–1998), Nigerian politician
Mallam Yahaya (born 1974), Ghanaian football player
Mohd Hisamudin Yahaya (born 1972), Malaysian politician  
Moses Amadu Yahaya, Ghanaian politician and building technician 
Moussa Yahaya (born 1975), Nigerian football striker 
Musa Yahaya (born 1997), Nigerian football player
Seidu Yahaya (born 1989), Ghanaian football player
Shabudin Yahaya, Malaysian politician
Shukri Yahaya (born 1988), Malaysian actor and model

See also
Sir Yahaya Memorial Hospital in Nigeria